Mandro Damin Bazar is a village in the Mandro CD block in the Sahibganj subdivision of the Sahibganj district in the Indian state of Jharkhand.

Geography

Location                                            

Overview
Rajmahal coalfield is shown in the map. The entire area is overwhelmingly rural with only small pockets of urbanisation.

Note: The full screen map is interesting. All places marked on the map are linked and you can easily move on to another page of your choice. Enlarge the map to see what else is there – one gets railway links, many more road links and so on.

Demographics
According to the 2011 Census of India, Mandro Damin Bazar had a total population of 1,179, of which 626 (53%) were males and 552 (47%) were females. Population in the age range 0–6 years was 209. The total number of literate persons in Mandro Damin Bazar was 675 (69.59% of the population over 6 years).

Civic administration

CD block HQ
Headquarters of Mandro CD block is at Mandro village.

Education
Kasturba Gandhi Balika Vidyalaya Mandro is a Hindi-medium girls only school established in 2005. It has facilities for teaching from class VI to class XII.
Model School Mandro is an English-medium coeducational school established in 2011, It has facilities for teaching from class VI to class IX.

BP High School Bhagaiya at Kourikhuttana is a Hindi-medium coeducational institution established in 1970. It has facilities for teaching from class IX to class XII.

References

Villages in Sahibganj district